José Romario Hernández Parra (born 14 June 1994) is a Mexican professional footballer who plays as a midfielder for UdeG.

External links

Liga MX players
Living people
Mexican footballers
1994 births
Footballers from Guadalajara, Jalisco

Association football midfielders
Leones Negros UdeG footballers